John William Stevenson (born September 10, 1963) is an American musician and record producer. He is the drummer, main songwriter, and the only constant member of the California punk rock group Descendents since its inception. In late December 1981, he played a few concerts with the hardcore punk band Black Flag because their drummer ROBO was detained in England after a tour there. He went on to record with Black Flag on several of their albums until 1985, including the highly influential My War. After this he focused his attention on Descendents and played with the band until lead singer Milo Aukerman left in 1987. After Milo's departure, Bill and the other members of Descendents, Karl Alvarez and Stephen Egerton, recruited singer Dave Smalley of Dag Nasty, moved to Fort Collins, Colorado, and formed All. All went on to have two more singers, Scott Reynolds (1989–1993) and Chad Price (1993–present). Aukerman came back for the 1996 album Everything Sucks, the 2004 album Cool to Be You, 2016's Hypercaffium Spazzinate and the newest album 9th and Walnut. All and Descendents continue to tour between Stevenson's and Aukerman's respective careers as a recording engineer and a biochemist.
Stevenson was born in Torrance, California and attended Mira Costa High School, with fellow members of the Descendents.

Stevenson, along with record producer Jason Livermore are the founders of the recording studio The Blasting Room in Fort Collins, Colorado. Currently, Stevenson is involved in Russ Rankin's side project Only Crime with former members of GWAR and Converge.

In 2005, he became a member of instrumental group The Mag Seven, and produced the group's album. He also played with The Lemonheads from 2005–2007, appearing on their 2006 self titled album, which he also helped produce.

One of Stevenson's most recent works is producing Rise Against's seventh studio album, The Black Market, which was released July 15, 2014, As I Lay Dying's Awakened as well as the 2012 NOFX album Self Entitled.

Early life
Bill Stevenson (birth name; John William Stevenson) was born on September 10, 1963. Stevenson grew up mostly with his father, Steve Stevenson. He describes his father as a cold man but present for him. Steve Stevenson worked two jobs and was 22 hours outside of his home and came to give Bill food and put him to bed. Around the age of fourteen or fifteen, Stevenson started working for Keith Morris' father as a fisherman. He attended Mira Costa High School where he met his friends and future bandmates of Descendents.

Career
Stevenson is an original member of the Descendents forming in 1978. The Descendents put out a single called "Ride the Wild / It's a Hectic World" in 1979. In 1982 they put out their first album Milo Goes to College. After the album, singer Milo Aukerman went to college, the band played rarely, so Stevenson joined Black Flag. He left Black Flag in 1985 to reform the Descendents. The Descendents became All in 1988 after Aukerman left once again. The Descendents would form again from 1996 to 1997 and then in 2002, before going on hiatus. From 2003 to 2007, Stevenson played in smaller bands until All played shows again in 2008. In 2010, the Descendents reformed again.

Membership timeline

Personal life 
Bill Stevenson has never tried recreational drugs in his life other than alcohol, which he did not drink until later in life.

In recent years, Stevenson has had some health issues. He grew a brain tumor unknowingly around 2008, which remained for another two years before being removed. The tumor caused Stevenson to lose motivation and eventually made him gain weight, had a blood clot, diabetes and sleep apnea. In 2010, he had a successful surgery to remove it which helped him to gain his health back. In 2016, Stevenson revealed he had open heart surgery.

Selected discography 
See also Albums produced by Bill Stevenson

 Descendents - Hypercaffium Spazzinate - (2016) Drums, producer, engineer
 The Last – Danger (2013) Drums
 Only Crime – Virulence (2007) Drums, Producer and Engineer
 The Lemonheads – The Lemonheads (2006) drums, producer
 Descendents – Cool to Be You (2004) Drums, producer, Backing Vocals
 Descendents – 'Merican (2004) Drums, producer, Backing Vocals
 Only Crime – To The Nines (2004) Drums, Produced, engineered, mixing, and mastering
 All/Descendents – Live Plus One [2 CD Split] (2001) Drums, producer
 All – Problematic (2000) Drums, producer
 All – ALL (1999) Drums, producer
 All – Mass Nerder (1998) Drums, producer
 Descendents – Everything Sucks (1996) Drums, producer
 All – Pummel (1995) Drums, producer
 All – Breaking Things (1993) Drums, producer
 All – Percolater (1992) Drums, producer
 Descendents – Somery (1991) Drums, producer, Artwork
 All – Allroy Saves (1990) Drums, producer, Backing Vocals
 All – Trailblazer (1990) Drums, producer
 Black Flag – I Can See You (1989) Drums
 All – Allroy's Revenge (1989) Drums, producer
 All – Allroy for Prez (1988) Drums, producer
 All – Allroy Sez (1988) Drums, producer
 Descendents – Hallraker (1988) Drums, producer
 Black Flag – Wasted...Again (1987) Drums
 Descendents – Liveage (1988) Drums, producer
 Descendents – ALL (1987) Drums, producer
 Descendents – Enjoy! (1986) Drums, engineer, Backing Vocals
 Descendents – I Don't Want to Grow Up (1985) Drums, engineer, Backing Vocals
 Minuteflag – MinuteFlag (1985) Drums
 Black Flag – In My Head (1985) Drums, producer
 Black Flag – The Process of Weeding Out (1985) Drums, producer
 Black Flag – Loose Nut (1985) Drums, producer, Backing Vocals
 Black Flag – Live '84 (1984) Drums, Mixing
 Black Flag – Slip It In (1984) Drums, producer
 Black Flag – Family Man (1984) Drums, engineer
 Black Flag – My War (1984) Drums, producer
 Black Flag – TV Party (1982) Drums
 Descendents – Milo Goes to College (1982) Drums, Backing Vocals
 Descendents – Fat (1981) Drums, Backing Vocals
 Descendents – Ride the Wild/It's a Hectic World single (1979) Drums, producer
 Higley - Higley (2017) Drums on almost all tracks, producer of almost the complete album

References

1963 births
American male film actors
Record producers from California
American rock drummers
Living people
Descendents members
Black Flag (band) members
Hardcore punk musicians
All (band) members
Musicians from Torrance, California
American punk rock drummers
American male drummers
Only Crime members
American audio engineers
Punk rock record producers
20th-century American drummers
Mira Costa High School alumni